This is a list of countries by public sector, calculated as the number of public sector employees as a percentage of the total workforce. Information is based mainly on data from the OECD and the ILO. If a source has figures for more than one year, only the most recent figure is used (with notes for exceptional circumstances).

In the former Eastern Bloc countries, the public sector in 1989 accounted for between 70% to over 90% of total employment. In China a full 78.3% of the urban labor force were employed in the public sector by 1978, the year the Chinese economic reform was launched, after which the rates dropped. Jin Zeng estimates the numbers were 56.4% in 1995 and 32.8% in 2003, while other estimates are higher.

In OECD countries, the average public sector employment rate was 21.3% in 2013.

List

See also 
 List of countries by employment rate
 List of countries by labour force
 Public sector

References 

Public sector
Public employment
Public economics
Public sector